Ochrosia kauaiensis, the Kauai yellowwood, is a species of plant in the family Apocynaceae. It is endemic to the island of Kauai in Hawaii.  It is threatened by habitat loss.

References

Trees of Hawaii
Endemic flora of Hawaii
kauaiensis
Endangered plants
Taxonomy articles created by Polbot